"Whose Bed Have Your Boots Been Under?" is a song by Canadian country music singer Shania Twain. It was issued to radio January 2, 1995, in the US, as the first single released from her second studio album The Woman in Me (1995). The song was the first single that Twain co-wrote with her then-husband Robert John "Mutt" Lange. The song became Twain's first hit on country radio, peaking at number 11. Radio stations began putting the song into high rotation after they noticed high amounts of the album selling. The commercial single of the song was released in June 1995 in the US as a double A-side single alongside "Any Man of Mine". In August 1995, the single was certified Gold for 500,000 sales, making it Twain's first Gold single. The song won the SOCAN Song of the Year award at the Canadian Country Music Awards in 1995.

Music video
The music video for "Whose Bed Have Your Boots Been Under?" was shot in Santa Ynez, California and directed by John Derek. It was filmed on December 19, 20 and  21, 1994 and released on January 2, 1995, on CMT. The video features Twain wearing a red dress, walking around in a smoky restaurant in the country. She interacts with various men in the restaurant, but she is invisible to them. These scenes are intercut with shots of her singing and playing guitar outside the restaurant. The video is available on Twain's DVD The Platinum Collection.

Critical reception
Billboard magazine praised Twain's "velvety vocals" and the "neat production twists" on the song. Music & Media wrote, "Ways to be jealous get new elan from lyrics only cowgirls can sing with so much rivalry in their voice. Dance remixer Brian Tankersly puts the forceful kick into the boots."

Chart performance
"Whose Bed Have Your Boots Been Under?" debuted on the Billboard Hot Country Singles & Tracks chart the week of January 14, 1995 at number 71. It spent 20 weeks on the chart and climbed to a peak position of number 11 on April 29, 1995, where it remained for two weeks. At the time, it was Twain's biggest single. The song ranked No. 40 on CMT's 40 Greatest Done-Me-Wrong Songs in 2004. It peaked at number 31 on the Billboard Hot 100 with her next single "Any Man of Mine".

Official versions
Album Version (4:25)
Radio Edit (3:59)
Dance Mix (4:50)
Live from Still the One: Live from Vegas (4:46)

Track listing
Released as "Whose Bed Have Your Boots Been Under? / Any Man Of Mine"

US Cassette Single (Mercury 856-448-4)

Side 1
Whose Bed Have Your Boots Been Under? (Edit)

Side 2
Any Man Of Mine

US CD Single (Limited Edition) (Mercury 856 449–2)
Whose Bed Have Your Boots Been Under? (Edit)
Any Man Of Mine
Whose Bed Have Your Boots Been Under? (Dance Mix)

Charts

Weekly charts

Year-end charts

Certifications

References

1995 singles
1995 songs
Shania Twain songs
Songs written by Robert John "Mutt" Lange
Song recordings produced by Robert John "Mutt" Lange
Songs written by Shania Twain
Mercury Records singles
Mercury Nashville singles
Canadian Country Music Association Song of the Year songs
Songs about infidelity
Music videos directed by John Derek